Azzedine Brahmi (born September 13, 1966 in Sétif) is an Algerian long-distance runner who competed mostly over 3000 metres steeplechase. He won a bronze medal at the 1991 World Championships. His best Olympic performances came in 1988 and 1992, when he finished eighth. He also competed at the 1988 Summer Olympics and the 1992 Summer Olympics.

Achievements 

1993 Mediterranean Games - 
1992 Summer Olympics - eighth place
1991 Mediterranean Games - 
1991 World Championships in Athletics - 
1990 Maghreb Championships - 
1989 African Championships - 
1988 Summer Olympics - eighth place
1988 African Championships - 
1986 Maghreb Championships -

References

External links

1966 births
Living people
Algerian male long-distance runners
Algerian male steeplechase runners
Athletes (track and field) at the 1988 Summer Olympics
Athletes (track and field) at the 1992 Summer Olympics
Olympic athletes of Algeria
Sportspeople from Sétif
World Athletics Championships medalists
Mediterranean Games gold medalists for Algeria
Mediterranean Games silver medalists for Algeria
Mediterranean Games medalists in athletics
Athletes (track and field) at the 1991 Mediterranean Games
Athletes (track and field) at the 1993 Mediterranean Games
21st-century Algerian people